Moorer may refer to:

moorer (mooring), person or organisation providing mooring services

Surname 
Allison Moorer (born 1972), alternative country singer, sister of Shelby Lynne
Jacob Moorer (1863–1935), South Carolina lawyer and civil rights activist
James A. Moorer (born 1945), digital audio and computer music engineer
Joseph P. Moorer (1922–2014), U.S. vice admiral
Lizelia Augusta Jenkins Moorer (1868–1936), South Carolina poet and teacher
MC Lyte (born 1971), hip-hop artist with given name Lana Moorer
Michael Moorer (born 1967), boxer and former WBA & IBF world champion
Shelby Lynne (born Shelby Lynn Moorer, 1968), American singer and songwriter
Stephen Moorer (born 1961), Californian actor, director and producer of live theatre
Terry F. Moorer (born 1961), United States District Judge
Thomas H. Moorer (1912–2004), U.S. admiral, Chief of Naval Operations, Chairman of the Joint Chiefs of Staff

See also 
Drewry-Mitchell-Moorer House, a historic mansion in Eufaula, Alabama, U.S.